Styrax can refer to:

 Styrax is a genus of about 130 species of large shrubs or small trees
 Styrax resin
 Saint Styrax was martyred along with Agapius, Atticus, Carterius, and others in 310 AD.
 Styrax is also the companion of the She-Ra: Princess of Power villain Shadow Weaver. 
 Styrax is the race horse that won the 1895 Grand Steeple-Chase de Paris.